Guy Tchingoma Ngoma (3 January 1986 – 9 February 2008) was a footballer who played as a midfielder for Gabonese club FC 105 Libreville. Born in the Republic of the Congo, he represented Gabon internationally.

International career
Tchingoma was born in Pointe-Noire, Republic of the Congo, but given Gabonese citizenship, allowing him to make his debut in an African Nations Cup qualifier against Côte d'Ivoire in Libreville on 8 September 2007.

Death
On 9 February 2008, Tchingoma collapsed after contact with an opposing player late in the match between his club and US Mbiliandzami at the Mondedang de Sibang stadium in the capital. He was later reported dead. There were no medics on call at the game.

References

External links

1986 births
2008 deaths
People from Pointe-Noire
Republic of the Congo emigrants
Immigrants to Gabon
People with acquired Gabonese citizenship
Gabonese footballers
Association football midfielders
FC 105 Libreville players
Gabon international footballers
Association football players who died while playing
Sport deaths in Gabon
Gabonese people of Republic of the Congo descent
21st-century Gabonese people